The fifth election to the Western Isles Council was held on 3 May 1990 as part of the wider 1990 Scottish regional elections.

The Council's inaugural Convener, Donald Macaulay, was re-elected to the position after an eight-year absence.  He would only serve until 1991, resigning in response to the collapse of the Bank of Credit and Commerce International which led to the Council losing £24 million.

Aggregate results

Ward Results

References

1990 Scottish local elections
1990